Iranian stand-up comedy refers to stand-up comedy by Iranians or based on Persian satire.

Notable figures
 Ebrahim Nabavi, 2005 Prince Claus Award winner
Hamed Ahangi
 Hadi Khorsandi
 Omid Djalili
 Maziar Jobrani
 Eslam Shams,  2006 Ensemble Academy Award Winner "West Bank Story"
 Shappi Khorsandi
 Mehran Khaghani, Best Comedian in Boston, 2010, Boston Phoenix
 Dan Ahdoot
 Max Amini
 Enissa Amani
Zahra Noorbakhsh
Tehran Von Ghasri

See also
Iranian cinema

References

External links
Hadi Khorsandi, Persian Stand-Up Comedy, Amsterdam, Dec. 2010 (Video: Persian Dutch Network)

 
Stand-up comedy